Pierre Shuai Yang (born on 27 January 1983) is a Chinese Australian lawyer and politician. He was elected to the Western Australian Legislative Council at the 2017 state election, as a Labor member in South Metropolitan Region. His term began on 22 May 2017.

Yang moved to Australia when he was 15-years-old (1998), as an overseas student. Around three years later, in September 2001, Yang joined the Labor Party, stating (of the party) in his inaugural speech in the Legislative Council: “The Labor Party believes in a fair and compassionate society where a fair day’s work will return a fair day’s pay and the most vulnerable of our community are supported and protected. The Labor Party believes in giving voice to the voiceless and creating jobs for the jobless, and the Labor Party believes in giving people a fair go.”

Yang was a member of Gosnells City Council before entering state politics. He joined the Australian Army Reserve in 2006, and at the rank of captain, was assigned as a liaison officer and translator on board the Chinese salvage/rescue vessel Dong Hai Jiu 101 during the search for Malaysia Airlines Flight 370.

On 16 May 2018, Yang was elected by the Labor Caucus to the position of Government Whip in the Legislative Council, following the resignation of the position by Martin Pritchard.

In December 2022, he became a parliamentary secretary to Simone McGurk, the minister for training, water, and youth.

Foreign agent allegations 
In 2018, it was reported that Yang had not declared to parliament his membership of the Northeast China Federation and the Association of Great China, which are allegedly affiliated with the Chinese Communist Party through its United Front Work Department. He subsequently stated that he had resigned from the two organisations.

References

1983 births
Living people
Australian Labor Party members of the Parliament of Western Australia
Members of the Western Australian Legislative Council
Chinese emigrants to Australia
Australian politicians of Chinese descent
University of Western Australia alumni
21st-century Australian politicians